Northcliffe is a town located in the lower South West region of Western Australia, about  south of the town of Pemberton. It is part of the Shire of Manjimup. At the 2006 census, Northcliffe had a population of 412. Currently, Northcliffe serves a population of around 770 people within the town and surrounding areas. Approximately 31% of the population have post-secondary qualifications.

It is largely surrounded by karri, marri and jarrah forest and is close to the Warren, D'Entrecasteaux and Shannon national parks. Primarily a dairy farming area since the region was populated under the Group Settlement scheme of the 1920s and 1930s, the district was also a centre for the tobacco and logging industries until both ceased, the former in 1960 and the latter under the Regional Forestry Agreement of 1999.

Geography 
The town was the centre of a Group Settlement Scheme in the 1920s, and was surveyed at the request of the Premier of Western Australia, James Mitchell in 1923. It became the terminus of the Bridgetown-Jarnadup railway, and was gazetted in May 1924. Mitchell named it after Lord Northcliffe, owner of The Times and the Daily Mail in London, and Director of Propaganda in the British government during World War I, who had died in 1922.

Local community organisations in Northcliffe include Northcliffe Pioneer Museum, Northcliffe Development Committee, Northcliffe Streetscape, Northcliffe Community Resource Centre, Northcliffe Family and Community Centre, Northcliffe Arts Association, Southern Forest Arts, Northcliffe Workers' Club, Northcliffe Recreation Association, Northcliffe Visitor Centre and Northcliffe Town Hall.

Northcliffe is close to Mt Chudalup (a granite monolith), Northcliffe Forest Park and the beaches of Windy Harbour. Indigenous sites of significance  include Tookalup.

Infrastructure 
The town has a district high school, post office, nursing post, cafe, museum, recreation centre, family and community centre, town hall, visitor centre and library, art gallery, community resource centre with internet access and Centrelink access point, hotel/motel, general store, food shop selling local produce and showcasing produce from the Southern Forests food bowl, and a public playground with barbecue and gazebo.

Businesses in the area include the Bannister Downs dairy, which sells milk and related products in biodegradable containers through local, regional and Perth-based outlets.

Northcliffe also serves the coastal holiday village of Windy Harbour. 

The Bibbulmun Track walking trail and Munda Biddi bicycle trail both pass through Northcliffe.

Significant events 
In February, 2015, Northcliffe and Windy Harbour were affected by the largest bushfire in Western Australia's history, which consumed approximately 100 000 hectares, forcing many of the residents to evacuate, but with no loss of life and minimal property damage. The effect on the forests, however, was extensive, with some affected parts still to show signs of recovery.

Politics
Polling place statistics are presented below from the Northcliffe polling place in the federal and state elections as indicated.

The current MLA for the Warren-Blackwood district is Jane Kelsie (Labor) and MLC is Diane Evers (Greens).

References

Towns in Western Australia
South West (Western Australia)
Timber towns in Western Australia
Bushfire affected towns in Western Australia